The Workers' Party (PT) was a French socialist party. It was formed by the Trotskyist Internationalist Communist Party (PCI), led by Pierre Boussel, better known under his pseudonym Pierre Lambert, together with a number of other socialists with whom they worked in the Force Ouvrière union confederation.

Within the PT the former PCI was known as the Internationalist Communist Organisation. In reality, despite including communist, socialist and  anarcho-syndicalist tendencies the PT was generally regarded as little more than a front for the Trotskyist PCI.

Its national secretary was Daniel Gluckstein (pseudonym: Seldjouk), who received less than 0.5% in the 2002 French presidential election.

Gérard Schivardi, candidate in the 2007 presidential elections under the PT, gained 0.34% of the votes. In the 10 and 17 June 2007 French National Assembly elections, the party won no seats. Despite these low national results, the PT polled better in local elections.

The PT published a magazine called Informations Ouvrières (Workers' News).

In June 2008, the PT was dissolved into the new Independent Workers' Party (Parti ouvrier indépendant)

See also
 Politics of France
 List of political parties in France

Related links
Official website
Informations Ouvrières
Contreculture.org

1991 establishments in France
2008 disestablishments in France
Communist parties in France
Defunct political parties in France
Political parties disestablished in 2008
Political parties established in 1991
Political parties of the French Fifth Republic
Trotskyist organizations in France